In ancient Latvian culture, Zvaigznes ("stars") referred to several different ideas.  

 short for Zvaigznes Diena, a holiday.
 Zelta Zvaigznes ("golden star") was an alternate name for Auseklis
 Ausekla Zvaigzne ("star of Auseklis") was Auseklis' symbol.
 There was a god named Zvaigznes, who represented the gari, the spirits of the stars.